Rage syndrome, also known as sudden onset aggression or (SOA) or avalanche of rage syndrome, is a rare but serious behavioural problem that has been reported most commonly in the English Springer Spaniel but also in a variety of other dog breeds. It is often misdiagnosed as it can be confused with other forms of aggression. It is thought to be genetic in origin and is inheritable. A variety of treatments are available, but will need to be tailored to the individual needs of the specific dog. The term rage syndrome is attributed to Dr. Roger A. Mugford, an English animal behaviour consultant. Seizures could cause neurological abnormalities that could cause brain damage and often result in random spurts of rage.

The rage syndrome has no connection to rabies, for which its name is often mistaken (from the Latin noun "rabiēs", meaning "rage").

Symptoms
The dog will suddenly act aggressively toward anyone nearby, but minutes later will be calm and normal. The dog does not seem to remember or realize what has taken place and may act immediately friendly to the person(s) whom they attacked. Attacks such as these cannot be prevented with training because it is a problem that the dog seemingly cannot consciously control. The attack will happen without apparent cause.

Shortly prior to an attack, their eyes can glaze over and go hard, followed by the dog snapping into alert mode before finally attacking. It appears to an outsider like an exaggerated form of aggression. Often a specific dog can have a certain trigger, such as the unexpected approach of people whilst he or she is sleeping.

Dr. Roger A. Mugford, to whom the term is attributed, identified that the problem starts on average at around seven and a half months old in English Springer Spaniels. However some of his research subjects showed signs at as early as three months and as late as two years. He did find however that many dogs displayed their first symptoms on or around one of the five critical learning periods identified in dogs. These occur at six weeks old, 12 weeks old, 24 weeks or six months, one year old and two years old.

Specific breed issues

English Cocker Spaniels

It has been reported that rage syndrome was found to be more common in red, golden/blonde or black cockers than in any other colour and specific lines tend to have a higher occurrence. All solid coloured cockers tend to be at higher risk than their multi-coloured counterparts, with darker colours being most affected. It is most often associated with the show lines of the breed although cases have been found in the working lines as well. The colour of the dog may not actually be genetically linked to the syndrome, but is more likely to reflect certain bloodlines. Cocker spaniel breeders do not commonly breed solid colours to parti-colours and so the two colour phases tend to be mostly distinct. Previous research in foxes in the 1970s linked particular coat colours with certain extreme behaviours and aggression.

English Springer Spaniels

Pure breed Springer Spaniels can show this condition as well.

Cause
Although the scientific evidence is limited, rage syndrome has been described as an epileptic disorder affecting the emotion-related parts of the dog's brain.  There is also some evidence that in at least some cases it is an inheritable genetic disorder. In English Springer Spaniels, the appearance of rage syndrome has been traced back to a winner at the Westminster Kennel Club show who went on to become a top stud. (see Popular sire effect)

Treatment
Often it can take a veterinarian who specializes in neurology or animal behavior to successfully diagnose rage syndrome and guardians may often not realize the condition's existence, simply believing it to be a training issue, or may confuse it with other forms of aggression. However it can only be thoroughly diagnosed by EEG or genetic testing and these tests can sometimes be inconclusive.

Ultimately, selective breeding should remove the issue from affected breeds. However, for a specifically affected dog, then a variety of treatments including antiepileptics have been reported to be effective, but not every treatment works for every dog and in some cases no treatments work, leaving euthanasia as the only solution.

Other breeds in which cases have been reported

Australian Shepherd
Australian Cattle Dog
Basset Hound
Beagle
Bernese Mountain Dog
Border Collie
Bulldog
Doberman Pinscher
Chesapeake Bay Retriever
Chinese Crested
Chow Chow
Dachshund
English Bull Terrier
French Bulldog
German Shepherd
Goldendoodle
Golden Retriever
Great Dane
Greater Swiss Mountain Dog
Jack Russell Terrier
Labrador Retriever
Papillon
Rottweiler

References

Syndromes in dogs
Rage (emotion)